Ampa Skywalk is a shopping mall in Chennai, India. With three floors of retail space, it has outlets for major clothing and apparel brands, a seven-screen multiplex, a games zone and a food court.

Location
The mall is located at Aminjikarai on the banks of Cooum River at the junction of Poonamallee High Road and Nelson Manikkam Road.

The mall
The mall is built on a three-acre plot. There is a 25m skywalk connecting the ticket boxes to the theatres. The food court in the mall, named F3, can accommodate 650 persons. The mall also has a  gaming area and a 20-room boutique hotel run by Auromatrix Hotels.

The mall has an eight-level parking lot which can accommodate approximately 1,000 cars and 1,000 two-wheelers. The parking scheme is considered relatively unorganized without clear marking or signage.

See also
Abhirami Mega Mall
Chennai Citi Centre
Express Avenue
Spencer Plaza

References

Shopping malls in Chennai
Shopping malls established in 2009
2009 establishments in Tamil Nadu